The European Men's U-17 Volleyball Championship is a sport competition for volleyball national teams with players under 17 years, currently held biannually and organized by the European Volleyball Confederation, the volleyball federation from Europe.

Results summary

Medal table

References

External links

Official website

Men's U17
Volleyball
 
European volleyball records and statistics